Pete Winslow (1934–1972) was a surrealist poet associated with the Beat Generation.

He was born on 19 October 1934 in Washington state. He died in September 1972 of complications following surgery and was survived by his wife Jane Winslow and son, Peter Winslow, who died in a car accident in 1993.

He graduated from the University of Washington in journalism in 1956.

His last book, Daisy in the Memory of a Shark, was published posthumously by City Lights Books in 1973.

Bibliography
 What Ever Happened to Pete Winslow? (Tolle House, 1960)
 The Rapist and Other Poems (Golden Mountain Press, 1962)
 Monster Cookies, Poems 1962-1966 - Illustrated by Ken Brandon (Self-published, 1967)
 Mummy Tapes, Poems 1969-70 (Medusa Press, 1971)
 Daisy in the Memory of a Shark - Pocket Poets Number 31 - with an introduction by Stephen Schwartz (City Lights Books, 1973)

References

External links
 Pete Winslow page at Empty Mirror Books
 City Lights Pocket Poets
 North Beach Library collects Beat works

20th-century American poets
1972 deaths
1934 births
University of Washington College of Arts and Sciences alumni